Gainsborough Division, Suffolk is an electoral division of Suffolk which returns one county councillor to Suffolk County Council. It is located in the South East Area of Ipswich and comprises the whole of Gainsborough Ward plus part of Holywells Ward, both of which are electoral wards of Ipswich Borough Council.

Councillors
The following councillors were elected since 2001.

References

Electoral Divisions of Suffolk
South East Area, Ipswich
Gainsborough District, Suffolk